Cannibal is a 2010 Belgian horror film written and directed by Benjamin Viré. It stars Nicolas Gob, Helena Coppejans, and Eric Godon.

Plot
Max, agoraphobic, lives as a recluse in the woods. While playing golf, he stumbles upon an unconscious and bloody young woman whom he brings home. She runs away one evening and he follows her. He then discovers that she seduces men, then eats them, after having made love with them. He covers up his misdeeds as best he can and a relationship between fear and tenderness sets in between them, until she is kidnapped. He decides to find her, whatever the ordeals...

Cast

Accolades

Nominated

2010 Festival International du Film Francophone de Namur: Youth Jury Emile Cantillon Award: Best Feature Film - Benjamin Viré 
2010 Raindance Film Festival: Jury Prize: Best Debut Feature - Benjamin Viré (director) 
2011 MOTELx - Festival Internacional de Cinema de Terror de Lisboa: International Competition: Room Service - Benjamin Viré
2011 Singapore International Film Festival: Director in Focus - Benjamin Viré

References

External links 

2010 films
2010 horror films
Belgian horror films